Gotvand is a city and capital of Gotvand County, Khuzestan Province, Iran. At the 2006 census, its population was 21,428, in 4,422 families. The Lower and Upper Gotvand Dams are located northeast of the city on the Karun River.

References

Populated places in Gotvand County

Cities in Khuzestan Province